Alvania dipacoi is a species of minute sea snail, a marine gastropod mollusk or micromollusk in the family Rissoidae.

Description
Alvania Dipacoi is a small sea snail with a shell of 2-2.6 mm in length. The shell is a spiral shape and generally an off white colour.

Distribution
It can be found in the Mediterranean sea around the Tuscan Archipelago, and also around the Canaries and West Africa.

References

Rissoidae
Gastropods described in 1989